Reta Shaw (September 13, 1912 – January 8, 1982) was an American character actress known for playing strong, hard-edged, working women in film and on many of the most popular television programs of the 1960s and 1970s in the United States. She may be best remembered as the housekeeper, Martha Grant, on the television series The Ghost & Mrs. Muir and as the cook, Mrs. Brill, in the 1964 film Mary Poppins.

Early life
Reta M. Shaw was born in South Paris, Maine, on September 13, 1912, to Edna M. (née Easson) and Howard Walker Shaw. Her father was an orchestra leader. Shaw's younger sister was actress Marguerite Shaw. The daughter and granddaughter of women who believed in spiritualism, Shaw reportedly once told a newspaper interviewer that she had been "brought up on a ouija board."

She was a graduate of the Leland Powers School of the Theater in Boston, Massachusetts.

Career
Shaw's first credited appearance on the Broadway stage was in 1947's It Takes Two. She then appeared in Virginia Reel and on Broadway in a comedic role as Mabel in the original production of The Pajama Game in 1954, as well as in Gentlemen Prefer Blondes, Picnic, and Annie Get Your Gun, the last on tour with Mary Martin. She had featured roles in several motion pictures, including Picnic, The Pajama Game, Mary Poppins, Pollyanna, The Ghost And Mr. Chicken, Bachelor in Paradise  and Escape to Witch Mountain.

She appeared in the first season (1958–1959) of The Ann Sothern Show in the role of Flora Macauley, the overbearing wife of Jason Macauley, played by Ernest Truex. She appeared in Pollyanna in 1960 as Tillie Langerlof. In the 1960–1961, she played the housekeeper Thelma on The Tab Hunter Show. She played a housekeeper in the 1961–1962 series Ichabod and Me and the Wiere Brothers′ landlady Mrs. Stansfield in Oh! Those Bells in 1962.

In 1961, she was cast as Cora in the episode "Uncle Paul's New Wife" of Pete and Gladys, starring Harry Morgan and Cara Williams. In that installment, Uncle Paul is played by Gale Gordon, a semi-regular on the series. During the 1964–1965 season, she was reunited with Williams with a recurring role on The Cara Williams Show as Mrs. Burkhardt, the wife of a business executive.

Shaw appears in a 1962 episode of the series Outlaws with Barton MacLane. She also plays a comic role for The Lucy Show as a grandmother who sits on a $500 bill that Lucy lost and soon after sits on Lucy's hand in the episode "Lucy Misplaces $2,000". Thereafter, she guest starred in the CBS anthology series The Lloyd Bridges Show.  She appears too as the bar hostess Teeney in the 1964 episode "The Richard Bloodgood Story" of the series Wagon Train. Shaw's character of Bertha/Hagatha, a matronly witch, is a recurring character on TV's Bewitched, and she performed as Miss Gormley in an episode of The Brian Keith Show.

Shaw appeared twice in CBS's The Andy Griffith Show, as escaped convict Big Maude Tyler ("Convicts at Large") and as Eleanora Poultice, the educated voice teacher of Barney Fife ("The Song Festers"). She guest-stars as well as Aunt Clara in the 1965 episode "Return from Outer Space") of Lost in Space. In the 1966 feature film The Ghost and Mr. Chicken Shaw portrays the banker's wife and leader of the "Psychic Occult Society", Mrs. Halcyon Maxwell. On 1967. she played a Thrush Agent, "Miss Witherspoon", in an episode of The Man from U.N.C.L.E.

On television, Shaw was seen on Mister Peepers, Armstrong Circle Theater, Alfred Hitchcock Presents and The Millionaire. In 1965, she appeared on The Dick Van Dyke Show as an unemployment office worker. In 1965, she also appeared in an episode of My Three Sons. She played a housekeeper named Fredocia whom Steve had hired after Bub took a trip to Ireland. That particular episode was Uncle Charley's first appearance. In 1966, she appeared in a bit part on That Girl as a department-store organist. In 1966, she appeared as Bessie, an undercover agent, in the episode of I Spy titled "Lisa".

Shaw co-starred on the sitcom The Ghost & Mrs. Muir where she played housekeeper Martha Grant. The show took place in the fictional fishing village of Schooner Bay, Maine while Shaw was born in South Paris, Maine.

Shaw also appeared on an episode (which aired September 23, 1968) in season 4 of I Dream of Jeannie titled "Jeannie and the Wild Pipchicks", in which she played a strict dietician who has her innermost inhibition released (in her case a beautiful butterfly). In The Odd Couple, she appeared as a nanny who was a former army colonel in the episode "Maid for Each Other", which aired on November 23, 1973. In 1973 she played country nurse Ozella Peterson in the Emergency! episode "Snakebite". In 1974, on Happy Days, she played the babysitter Mrs. McCarthy in the episode titled "Breaking Up Is Hard to Do". Her final performance came in the 1975 film Escape to Witch Mountain in the role of Mrs. Grindley, owner of the orphanage where Tia and Tony are sent after the death of their foster parents.

Personal life and death
Shaw married and divorced actor William Forester. While married the couple had one child, daughter Kathryn Anne Forester.

Shaw died in 1982 at age 69 from emphysema in Encino, California. She was cremated and interred in a niche in the Columbarium of Remembrance at Forest Lawn Memorial Park, Hollywood Hills Cemetery.

Filmography

References

External links

1912 births
1982 deaths
Actresses from Maine
American film actresses
American musical theatre actresses
American television actresses
Deaths from emphysema
People from Paris, Maine
Actresses from Los Angeles
Burials at Forest Lawn Memorial Park (Hollywood Hills)
20th-century American actresses
20th-century American singers
20th-century American women singers